Robbie Ross (born 24 January 1975) is an Australian former rugby league footballer who played in the 1990s and 2000s. An Australian international and New South Wales State of Origin representative fullback, he played his club football with the Newcastle Knights, Brisbane Broncos and Hunter Mariners before settling at the Melbourne Storm with whom he won the 1999 Premiership.

Early life
Born in Griffith, New South Wales. Ross was educated at Swansea High School, where he represented 1992 Australian Schoolboys.

Robbie is a local Newcastle Knights junior.

Playing career
Ross forced clubmate Robbie O'Davis onto the wing during the 1995 season.  Ross, who signed a Super League contract that year, joined Brisbane while News Ltd fought a battle through the courts to stage its rebel competition.

The potent attacking  later honoured his contract with the newly formed Hunter Mariners in 1997.  Ross represented New South Wales in the Super League Tri-series competition, but following the demise of the Mariners and the re-unification of the game, quickly secured a contract with the Melbourne Storm.

A great start to the 1999 season saw Ross chosen for the New South Wales rugby league team. In the second match of 1999 State of Origin series, Ross scored the fastest try in Origin history when Ryan Girdler sent him over in the corner from the second tackle of the match. Later that year, Ross played at fullback for Melbourne in their historic 1999 NRL Grand Final victory and was catapulted into the Australian Test team. After making his debut in the first match of the 1999 Tri-nations series, a 24–22 loss to New Zealand, he was replaced by Darren Lockyer for the remainder of the tournament.

Ross started the 2000 NRL season in superlative form. He scored 9 tries in 13 matches and retaining his position as New South Wales fullback, but was ruled out with a knee injury that was more serious than first thought. He was also awarded the Australian Sports Medal for his contribution to Australia's international standing in rugby league. After being sidelined for the season, Ross returned in 2001 only to be hampered by chronic hamstring trouble. During 2002–03, matches were kept to a minimum, where Ross spent lengthy amounts of time on the sidelines with hamstring, knee and back injuries. He retired just before the start of the 2004 season at only 29 years of age, after it was revealed he had a bulging disc in his back.

Statistics

NRL
 Statistics are correct to the end of career

State of Origin

Australia

References

External links
Robbie Ross at stateoforigin.com.au

1975 births
Living people
Australia national rugby league team players
Australian rugby league players
Brisbane Broncos players
Hunter Mariners players
Melbourne Storm players
New South Wales Rugby League State of Origin players
Newcastle Knights players
Recipients of the Australian Sports Medal
Rugby league fullbacks
Rugby league players from Newcastle, New South Wales